Rashtrakavi is an Indian title meaning "National Poet" and may refer to:

Dursa Arha (1535–1655)
Subramania Bharati (1882–1921)
M. Govinda Pai (1883–1963)
Maithili Sharan Gupt (1886–1965)
Kuvempu (1904–1994)
Harivansh Rai Bachchan (1907–2003)
Ramdhari Singh Dinkar (1908–1974)
Kavi Pradeep (1915–1998)
G. S. Shivarudrappa (1926–2013)
Balkavi Bairagi (1931–2018)

See also 

 Yug Charan
 Kaviraja